Biota may refer to:
 Biota (ecology), the plant and animal life of a region
 Biota, genus and common name for a coniferous tree, Platycladus orientalis
 Biota, Cinco Villas, a municipality in Aragon, Spain
 Biota (band), a band from Colorado, USA
 Biota!, a proposed aquarium in London
 Biota (album), a 1982 album by Mnemonist Orchestra

See also